Zahid Faruk (born 26 November 1950) is a Bangladesh Awami League politician who is the incumbent State Minister of Water Resources and Jatiya Sangsad member representing the Barisal-5 constituency since January 2019.

Career
Faruk was elected to Parliament on 30 December 2018 from Barisal-5 as a Bangladesh Awami League candidate. He was appointed the State Minister of Water Resources in the Fourth Sheikh Hasina Cabinet.

References

1950 births
Living people
Awami League politicians
11th Jatiya Sangsad members
State Ministers of Water Resources (Bangladesh)
Place of birth missing (living people)